Avondance is a commune in the Pas-de-Calais department in northern France.

Geography
A tiny village situated some 15 miles (24 km) east of Montreuil-sur-Mer, on the D154 road, the source of the small river Planquette.

Population

See also
Communes of the Pas-de-Calais department

References

External links

Communes of Pas-de-Calais
Artois